Kani Shinka (also Romanized as Kānī Shīnkā; also known as Kānī Shīnkān) is a village in Mangur-e Gharbi Rural District, in the Central District of Piranshahr County, West Azerbaijan Province, Iran. At the 2006 census, its population was 164, in 24 families.

References 

Populated places in Piranshahr County